The following is a list of Cosmopolitan Clubs grouped by continent and geographic region. The Cosmopolitan Club is a private social club with groups located in approximately every corner of the world.

North America
Canada
Cosmopolitan Club (Winnipeg), service club with special emphasis on supporting efforts to prevent and find a cure for diabetes

United States
In the United States the Cosmopolitan Club movement began in the University of Wisconsin in 1903.
 
 Bath Cosmopolitan Club (Maine): Established 1913;
 Illinois Cosmopolitan Club: Established 1907;
 Cosmopolitan Club (New York): The New York women's private club. Established 1909;
 Cosmopolitan Club of Philadelphia: Established 1928;

Asia

China
 Shanghai Cosmopolitan Club;

India
 Bombay Cosmopolitan Club: Established 1891;
 The Cosmopolitan Club (Chennai): is one of the three 18-hole golf courses in Chennai, India. Established: 1873;
 The Cosmopolitan Club (Coimbatore), founded 1891;
 The Cocanada Cosmopolitan Club (Kakinada), founded 1918

Europe

United Kingdom
 Dosthill Cosmopolitan Club (Staffordshire);
London, Cosmopolitan Club (London), active 1852-1902, members included M. E. Grant Duff

Oceania

Australia
 Innisfail Cosmopolitan Club: Destroyed by a bomb Saturday 28 May 1932 (c.f. The Canberra Times);

New Zealand
 Hamilton Cosmopolitan Club:  Established 1964
 Levin Cosmopolitan Club: Establishes when some local gentleman were not permitted to play darts at a local hotel, Established: 1901
 Masterton Cosmopolitan Club: Established 1973;
 Napier Cosmopolitan Club: Established 1877, Chartered 1881;
 Upper Hutt Cosmopolitan Club: Established 1961;
 Wanganui  Cosmopolitan Club:Established 1901;
Also: Taumarunui, Taupo and Tokoroa;

References

Clubs and societies
Women's clubs